Ishiguro (written:  lit. "black stone") is a Japanese surname. Notable people with the surname include:

 Aya Ishiguro (石黒彩) (born 1978), a.k.a. Ayappe, singer
  Hidé Ishiguro, Philosopher
 Hideo Ishiguro (石黒英雄), Japanese actor
 Hiroshi Ishiguro (石黒浩), professor at Osaka University who works in robotics
 Kazuo Ishiguro (石黒一雄), Japanese-born British author and Nobel Prize winner
 Keishichi Ishiguro (石黒敬七), Japanese judoka
 Keisho Ishiguro (石黒敬章), Japanese photo collector
 Ken Ishiguro (石黒賢), Japanese actor
 Kenji Ishiguro (石黒健治), Japanese photographer
 Kyōhei Ishiguro (イシグロキョウヘイ) (born 1980), Japanese director
 Masakazu Ishiguro (石黒正数), Japanese tennis manga artist
 Masayuki Ishiguro (石黒将之), Japanese handball player who plays in German
 Noboru Ishiguro (石黒昇), Japanese animator and anime series director
 Osamu Ishiguro (石黒修), Japanese tennis player
, Japanese sport wrestler
 Tatsuya Ishiguro (石黒竜也), Japanese kickboxer
 Yumiko Ishiguro (石黒由美子), Japanese synchronized swimmer
 Ishiguro Tadanori (石黒忠悳) (1845-1941), Japanese Army physician

See also
 7354 Ishiguro, a main-belt asteroid

Japanese-language surnames